Sir William Baillie of Polkemmet, 2nd Baronet, DL (2 February 1816 – 21 July 1890) was a Scottish oarsman and Conservative politician who sat in the British House of Commons between 1845 and 1847.

Life

Born in Edinburgh, he was the eldest son of Sir William Baillie, 1st Baronet and his wife Mary Lyon Dennistoun, the youngest daughter of James Dennistoun. Baillie was educated at Eton College and then at Christ Church, Oxford, where he graduated with a Bachelor of Arts degree in 1836.

While at Oxford, he rowed in the Oxford eight   in the second Boat Race which was held in 1836, when Cambridge won. He was also a part of the Head of the River crew at Oxford with his college boat, Christ Church.

Baillie served as captain in the Midlothian Yeomanry Cavalry, and was Lieutenant-Colonel commanding the Edinburgh City Artillery from 1866 to 1884. In 1845 he was elected Member of Parliament for Linlithgowshire, sitting for the next two years. Baillie was a Deputy Lieutenant of Linlithgowshire from 1850 and was a Justice of the Peace.

In 1878 he was the honorary commander of the City Artillery Volunteer Corps based at 27 Cockburn Street, Edinburgh.

Family

On 14 April 1846, Baillie married Mary Stewart, the eldest daughter of Stair Hathorn Stewart. In 1854, he succeeded his father as baronet, and when Baillie died childless in 1890, he was succeeded in the baronetcy by his nephew George.

See also
List of Oxford University Boat Race crews

References

External links

1816 births
1890 deaths
Scottish Tory MPs (pre-1912)
Members of the Parliament of the United Kingdom for Scottish constituencies
UK MPs 1841–1847
Baronets in the Baronetage of the United Kingdom
Deputy Lieutenants of Linlithgowshire
Alumni of Christ Church, Oxford
People educated at Eton College